The 1993–94 season was the 93rd season in Athletic Bilbao's history and their 63rd consecutive season in La Liga, the top division of Spanish football.

Season summary

1993–94 was the second season in charge of Athletic for Jupp Heynckes, and the team continued to improve under the German's leadership, ending the La Liga campaign in 5th place. This qualified them for the 1994–95 UEFA Cup, ending five seasons without European competition. In the Copa del Rey, Bilbao reached the fourth round before being eliminated by Real Zaragoza.

Despite this success, Heynckes left the club at the end of the season to accept the position of head coach with Eintracht Frankfurt in his homeland. Former Athletic player and current Racing Santander coach Javier Irureta was appointed as his replacement.

Squad statistics

Appearances and goals

|}

Results

La Liga

League table

See also
1993–94 La Liga
1993–94 Copa del Rey

References

External links
 

Athletic Bilbao
Athletic Bilbao seasons